The canton of Chagny is an administrative division of the Saône-et-Loire department, eastern France. Its borders were modified at the French canton reorganisation which came into effect in March 2015. Its seat is in Chagny.

It consists of the following communes:
 
Aluze
Bouzeron
Chagny
Chamilly
Change
Charrecey
Chassey-le-Camp
Chaudenay
Cheilly-lès-Maranges
Couches
Dennevy
Dezize-lès-Maranges
Dracy-lès-Couches
Essertenne
Fontaines
Morey
Paris-l'Hôpital
Perreuil
Remigny
Rully
Saint-Bérain-sur-Dheune
Saint-Gilles
Saint-Jean-de-Trézy
Saint-Léger-sur-Dheune
Saint-Maurice-lès-Couches
Saint-Sernin-du-Plain
Sampigny-lès-Maranges

References

Cantons of Saône-et-Loire